The Sheffield local elections were held on 12 May 1960, with one third of the council up for election, as well as a double vacancy for the Ecclesall ward. The elections seen heavy swings against the ruling Labour Party, resulting in four losses and further narrow defends in wards Labour had represented consistently for a considerable amount of time. The seats Labour lost were Heeley, Moor and Sharrow to the Conservative-Liberals and Firth Park became the first ever win for the Ratepayers Association. Weather was blamed for Labour's slump, with one article labelling it as 'the year of Tory weather', recording a low of 25% turnout.

Election result

This result has the following consequences for the total number of seats on the Council after the elections:

Ward results

|- style="background-color:#F6F6F6"
! style="background-color: " |
| colspan="2"   | Ratepayers Association gain from Labour.
| align="right" | Swing
| align="right" |
|-

References

Sheffield
Sheffield City Council elections
1960s in Sheffield
Sheffield City Council election